Sai Karthik (born 20 September 1997) is an Indian cricketer. He made his List A debut for Puducherry in the 2018–19 Vijay Hazare Trophy on 4 October 2018.

References

External links
 

1997 births
Living people
Indian cricketers
Pondicherry cricketers
Place of birth missing (living people)